Talala may refer to:

 Talala, Oklahoma, United States
 Talala, Gujarat, India
 Talala TOUCH (Vidhan Sabha constituency), India